Aleksander Warma VR I/3 (also Varma;  – 23 December 1970) was an Estonian navy officer, diplomat and painter.

Biography
Aleksander Warma studied at marine schools of Käsmu and Narva, took a deep sea captain's exam in Riga. In 1920, he took the high school exams to the examination committee of the Tallinn Teachers' Seminar. 1920–1924 studied at the dept. of the law of Tartu University, graduated with the 1st-degree diploma, 1928 Master of Law. Member of Estonian Students' Society.

In World War I, he served in the Russian Baltic fleet. In Estonian War of Independence, he served in the Estonian Navy, was chief of staff of navy in 1919–1920. After the war was commander of a navy ship Mardus. In 1924–1926, he was assistant to the jurisconsult of the Ministry of War. In 1926 Warma retired as lieutenant commander.

In 1926–1927, Warma was Director of the legal bureau of the Ministry of Foreign Affairs, 1927–1931 Director of the Administrative Dept. of Foreign Affairs, 1931–1933 Counsellor of the Estonian Legation in Moscow, 1933–1938 Consul-General in Leningrad (today St. Petersburg), 1938–1939 Estonian Envoy to Lithuania, 1939–1944 to Finland. 1953–1962 Warma was Minister of Foreign Affairs and Acting Minister of Justice, 1962–1963 Acting Prime Minister in duties of the Minister of Foreign Affairs of the Estonian government-in-exile. Warma served as Prime Minister in duties of the President of the Republic of Estonia March 29. 1963 – December 23, 1970.

Since 1964 he was also Estonian diplomatical representative in Paris.

See also 
 Estonian War of Independence

References

Sources 
 Aleksander Warma
 Ülo Kaevats et al. 2000. Eesti Entsüklopeedia 14. Tallinn: Eesti Entsüklopeediakirjastus, 

1890 births
1970 deaths
People from Kuusalu Parish
People from Kreis Harrien
Government ministers of Estonia
Envoys of Estonia
Estonian anti-communists
University of Tartu alumni
Estonian military personnel of the Estonian War of Independence
Recipients of the Order of the White Star, 2nd Class
Estonian World War II refugees
Estonian emigrants to Sweden